Tanda is a town in Ambedkar Nagar district in the Indian state of Uttar Pradesh situated on the banks of Ghaghara River. It is a nagar palika parishad and is part of Faizabad division (officially Ayodhya division) in Uttar Pradesh. Tanda is also a tehsil in the district. It has one of the largest handloom weaving industries for manufacturing varieties like gamchha, lungi, polyester clothing, check-shirt clothes material in state of Uttar Pradesh.

History 

Tanda has a rich historical background. It used to be a barren land until the Mughal Emperor Farrukhsiyar asked Raja Syed Mohammad Hayat to make a civilization on the bank of the Ghaghara river in 1714 A.D. The royal estate of Tanda stretched from the borders of old Awadh State to the borders of Bihar.

Before the famous 1857 mutiny, Tanda’s then Raja Syed Hussain Ali, with his brother Raja Syed Abbas Ali, stood against British army troops, which were moving towards Delhi, and fought a fierce battle in which many of the Estate’s soldiers died. It was Raja Syed Mohammad Raza who by his virtue of intelligence was able to hold on the legacy. Raja Syed Mohammad Abbas and Raja Syed Hussain Abbas continued with the legacy. Today, Raja Syed Kazim Raza ( Najmi ) and Raja Syed Jafar Raza ( Parvez ) holds the heritage Because Ahmed Raza, The son of Hussain Abbas and the elder brother of Najmi migrated from India To Pakistan.

Demographics 
According to the 2011 census of India, the Tanda Nagar Palika Parishad had a population of 95,516, of which 49,429 were males while 46,087 were females. The population of children in the age range 0-6 was 12,090 which is 12.66% of total population of Tanda. The total number of literates in Tanda was 64,736, which constituted 67.8% of the population with male literacy of 71.5% and female literacy of 63.8%. The effective literacy rate of 7+ population of Tanda was 77.6%, of which male literacy rate was 81.8% and female literacy rate was 73.1%. The Scheduled Castes and Scheduled Tribes population was 7,094 and 3 respectively. Tanda had 14597 households in 2011.

The most commonly spoken languages are Hindi, Awadhi and Urdu.

Government and politics

Administration 
As of 2022, Ram Murti Verma from Samajwadi Party is the MLA in the Uttar Pradesh Legislative Assembly representing Tanda constituency of Uttar Pradesh Legislative Assembly.

Naseem Rehana Ansari Advocate was the chairman of Nagar Palika Parishad Tanda who died during her tenure. Lalji Verma, Ex-MLA Ex-minister of Uttar Pradesh Govternment hails from the same constituency. Dr. Masood Ahmad was the education minister from Prithvipur village near Hanswar of this region. Heera Lal Yadav who is Member of Legislative Council hails from Saslahpur Rajaur village of this area.

Civic amenities and services

Hospitals
 Mahamaya Rajkiya Allopathic Medical College serve as local Hospital for Tanda and entire Ambedkar Nagar district.

Economy 
Tanda is an industrial city famous for its Tanda Terricot clothes. The "Tanda Terricot" are now manufactured on power looms. However, the city has a long history of weaving using hand looms. Things changed with the introduction of electricity in the early 1960s.

Other important industrial establishments in the region include a power plant run by the National Thermal Power Corporation . National Thermal Power Corporation has an installed capacity of 440 MW (4 x 110 MW). The power plant also houses a residential colony along with a hospital and the educational facilities.

Culture 
Many festivals are celebrated here such as Diwali Holi, Durga Pooja, Janmashtami by Hindus and Eid Al Fitr, Eid Al Adha, Eid Milad-un-Nabi (Birth Anniversary of Prophet Hazrat Mohammad), 10th of Muharram, Shab E Baraat by Muslims. Govind Sahab Mela, Ambedkar Jayanti (Birthday of B R Ambedkar) on 14 April and Haroon Rasheed Mela are the most common festivals that are celebrated annually here.

Transportation

By train
Tanda is well connected by road to the rest of the country. The rail connections are used primarily for goods transportation for the power plant and the cement factory. For passenger transportation, Akbarpur Junction, Faizabad Junction (Ayodhya Cantt Jn)] and Ayodhya Junction is the main option. Akbarpur has located about 58 km from Ayodhya. Tanda is around 187 km from Lucknow.

By road
Government bus services are not available to nearby towns and cities, so many private travel agencies provide bus services to Akbarpur, Hanswar, Baskhari, Rajesultanpur, Azamgarh, Basti, Gorakhpur, Jaunpur, Varanasi,  Ayodhya, Lucknow, Kanpur and Delhi.

By air
The nearest international airports are the  Maryada Purushottam Shri Ram International Airport (under construction) in Ayodhya, Lal Bahadur Shastri Airport in Varanasi and Chaudhary Charan Singh International Airport in Lucknow. Nearest domestic airport is Gorakhpur Airport in Gorakhpur.

Road 

The town is directly connected with Basti by National Highway 28 passing through Tanda-Kalwari Bridge. The town is connected to Banda by National Highway 128 via Akbarpur, Sultanpur and Raebareli. 
Road connectivity:
 National Highway 233A (India)
 National Highway 232 (India)
 Tanda-Azamgarh Road
 Tanda-Rajesultanpur Road
 Tanda-Basti Road
 Tanda- Ayodhya Road

Education
Adarsh Janta Inter College, Tanda Ambedkar Nagar
D.A.V. Academy,Tanda
D A V Public School, Tanda
Qaumi Inter College Tanda Ambedkar Nagar

References 

Cities and towns in Ambedkar Nagar district